Helena Třeštíková is a Czech documentary film director, member of the European Film Academy, and briefly the Czech Republic's Culture Minister. She resigned from the position in January 2007 after serving less than three weeks.

References

External links 
 

1949 births
Living people
Czech documentary filmmakers
Czech women film directors
Culture ministers of the Czech Republic
Women government ministers of the Czech Republic
KDU-ČSL Government ministers
Women documentary filmmakers
21st-century Czech women politicians